Robert Rozanski (born 1 April 1961 in Wolin, Poland) is a Norwegian sprint canoer who competed in the mid-1980s. He finished eighth in the C-1 500 m event at the 1984 Summer Olympics in Los Angeles.

References
Sports-Reference.com profile

1961 births
Canoeists at the 1984 Summer Olympics
Living people
Norwegian male canoeists
Olympic canoeists of Norway
Norwegian people of Polish descent
People from Wolin (town)